William Younger (born 22 March 1940 – died 2007) was a footballer who played in The Football League for Nottingham Forest, Lincoln City Walsall, Doncaster Rovers  and Hartlepools United.

References

1940 births
2007 deaths
Date of death missing
Place of death missing
English footballers
Association football inside forwards
Nottingham Forest F.C. players
Lincoln City F.C. players
Walsall F.C. players
Doncaster Rovers F.C. players
Hartlepool United F.C. players
Ramsgate F.C. players
English Football League players